Mont-Saint-Hilaire (also designated exo3) is a commuter railway line in Greater Montreal, Quebec, Canada. It is operated by Exo, the operator of public transport services across this region.

The Mont-Saint-Hilaire line was operated by the Canadian National Railway (CN) between 1859 and 1988. The line was not active until Exo's predecessor agency, the Agence Métropolitaine de transport (AMT), resumed passenger service in 2000.

There are 7 inbound and 7 outbound departures per weekday. This line does not run on weekends.

Overview
This line links the Central Station in downtown Montreal with Mont-Saint-Hilaire, on Montreal's South Shore.

The line offers seven departures every weekday morning towards Montreal and seven returns to Saint-Hilaire every weekday evening.  It is also the only commuter train line not to have any train stations on the island of Montreal outside of Downtown Montreal.  All the other train lines have at least 4 stops before leaving the island.

The trains are owned and managed by Exo, and operated by Bombardier's Transportation division.

Today, over 9,000 people ride this train daily.

History

CN service
This commuter route was opened by CN in 1859. Equipment in the late 1960s and early 1970s, operated once daily each direction, was a hodgepodge of ca 1930 coaches and an equally eclectic mix of yard switchers, freight and passenger diesel electric engines. Service was suspended in 1988, due to low ridership and old equipment used.

Central Station – Saint-Isidore shuttle service
During the Oka Crisis in the summer of 1990, the Société de transport de la communauté urbaine de Montréal (STCUM) organised a temporary rail shuttle service between Montreal Central Station and the town of Saint-Isidore due to the closure of the Honoré Mercier Bridge during said crisis. That service used part of the present-day Mont-Saint-Hilaire line between Montreal Central Station and Saint-Lambert station via Victoria Bridge, and then branched off to the CN Rouses Point Subdivision towards Saint-Isidore.

AMT service
The Mont-Saint-Hilaire line was re-opened in 2000 (between Montreal Central Station and McMasterville) by the AMT as a measure to mitigate traffic congestion caused by roadwork. Train service was progressively increased to respond to rapidly growing demand. The line was extended to its current terminus at Mont-Saint-Hilaire in 2002.

RTM/Exo service
On June 1, 2017, the AMT was dissolved and replaced by two new governing bodies, the Autorité régionale de transport métropolitain (ARTM) and the Réseau de transport métropolitain (RTM). The RTM took over all former AMT services, including this line.

In May 2018, the RTM rebranded itself as Exo, and rebranded each line with a number and updated colour. The Mont-Saint-Hilaire line became Exo 3, and its line colour was updated to a lighter pastel shade of violet.

List of stations
The following stations are on the Mont-Saint-Hilaire line:

The commuter line operates over the following Canadian National subdivision:

 Saint-Hyacinthe Subdivision (between St-Hilaire [54.2] and Montreal [74.1])

References

External links
Official RTM website

Exo commuter rail lines
Rail transport in Montérégie
Railway lines opened in 2000
Saint-Bruno-de-Montarville
Transport in Saint-Lambert, Quebec
Transport in Longueuil
Transport in Montreal
Railway lines opened in 1859
1859 establishments in Canada
La Vallée-du-Richelieu Regional County Municipality